I'll Carry You in My Arms or I'll Carry You on My Hands is a 1958 West German drama film directed by Veit Harlan and starring Kristina Söderbaum, Hans Holt and Hans Nielsen. It was based on the novella Viola Tricolor by Theodor Storm, which had previously been made in 1937 as Serenade. It was the final film of Harlan's career.

The film's sets were designed by the art director Ernst H. Albrecht. It was shot using Agfacolor at the Pichelberg Studios in Berlin and on location in Florence and Holstein.

Plot summary

Cast
 Kristina Söderbaum as Ines Thormälen
 Hans Holt as Rudolf Asmus
 Hans Nielsen as Dr. Compagnuolo
 Barbara Haller as Nesi
 Hilde Körber as Anne
 Monika Dahlberg as Pia
 Günter Pfitzmann as Georg
 Frank von dem Bottlenberg as Giacomo
 Malte Jaeger as Geistlicher im Zug

References

Bibliography 
 Bock, Hans-Michael & Bergfelder, Tim. The Concise CineGraph. Encyclopedia of German Cinema. Berghahn Books, 2009.
 Noack, Frank. Veit Harlan: The Life and Work of a Nazi Filmmaker. University Press of Kentucky, 2016.

External links 
 
 

1958 films
West German films
German drama films
1958 drama films
1950s German-language films
Films directed by Veit Harlan
Films based on works by Theodor Storm
Films based on short fiction
Films about remarriage
Films about widowhood
Constantin Film films
1950s German films